Medby Chapel is a chapel of the Church of Norway in Senja Municipality in Troms og Finnmark county, Norway.  It is located in the village of Medby on the west coast of the island of Senja. It is an annex chapel for the Torsken parish which is part of the Senja prosti (deanery) in the Diocese of Nord-Hålogaland. The white, wooden chapel was built in a long church style in 1937. The chapel seats about 170 people.

History
Holmenvær was one of the largest fishing villages in the region and this church was built there in 1890. The church was in use there until about 1933. After motorized boats became more common, fishermen left Holmenvær to live in larger settlements on the main island of Senja. Eventually, the church was no longer used and it was decided that it would be moved to Medby on Senja island. The church was moved and rebuilt and then consecrated on 29 August 1937. The church was enlarged and renovated in 1967.

See also
List of churches in Nord-Hålogaland

References

Senja
Churches in Troms
Wooden churches in Norway
20th-century Church of Norway church buildings
Churches completed in 1937
1890 establishments in Norway
Long churches in Norway